CETIS (Centro de Estudios Tecnológicos Industrial y de Servicios or Industrial Technologies and Services Studies Center) is a chain of Mexican high schools (known in Mexico as ) which offers programs to upgrade the regular degree to a technical-professional level. CETIS has campuses located in 31 states and the Federal District.

Jointly with the CBTIS, CETIS schools are part of the technical school of the DGETI, and are dependent of SEP.

Careers
The CETIS offers technical careers is several fields like accountancy, electronics, computer science, construction, education, cosmetology, tourism, etc. These careers differ in each school.

Location
There are 168 CETIS in México:

See also
 CBTA (Centro de Bachillerato Tecnológico Agropecuario)
 CBTF (Centro de Bachillerato Tecnológico Forestal)
 CBTIS (Centro de Bachillerato Tecnológico Industrial y de Servicios)
 CEB (Centro de Estudios de Bachillerato)
 CETAC (Centro de Estudios Tecnológicos en Aguas Continentales)
 CETMAR (Centro de Estudios Tecnológicos del Mar)
 PFLC (Preparatoria Federal Lázaro Cárdenas)
 PREFECO (Preparatoria Federal por Cooperación)

References

External links
 DGETI

High schools in Mexico